Brooklyn Bridge is a bridge connecting Manhattan and Brooklyn, New York.

Brooklyn Bridge may also refer to:

Transport
Brooklyn Bridge, New South Wales, a bridge in New South Wales, Australia
Brooklyn Bridge, a bridge on the Federation Trail to Brooklyn, Victoria, Australia
Brooklyn Bridge–City Hall (IRT Lexington Avenue Line), a subway station next to Brooklyn Bridge in Manhattan, New York, U.S.

Other uses
Brooklyn Bridge (film), a 1981 Ken Burns documentary 
Brooklyn Bridge (TV series), an American television series
Brooklyn Bridge (album), 1968 album by The Brooklyn Bridge
Brooklyn Bridge, a novel by Karen Hesse
Brooklyn Bridge (software), a file transfer / data transfer program
The Brooklyn Bridge (band), a pop band

See also
Brooklyn Bridge Park, a park in Brooklyn, New York, near the Brooklyn Bridge